St. Theresa's Medical University of Yerevan (also known as St. Theresa Charitable Sisters Medical Institute) is a private school in Yerevan, Armenia, established in 1992. It is ranked 10th among private medical schools in Armenia, and graduates of St. Theresa's possess certified specialist qualifications.

It is the only institute in Armenia that participates in the international market of physician placement.

References

External links
 

Education in Yerevan
Educational institutions established in 1992
Hospitals in Yerevan
Universities in Armenia
1992 establishments in Armenia